Torrelles may refer to:
Torrelles de Foix, municipality in the comarca of Alt Penedès
Torrelles de Llobregat, municipality in the comarca of the Baix Llobregat